Blake Enzie (born September 2, 2001) is a Canadian skeleton racer who has competed since 2019.

Career

Junior
Enzie represented Canada had two IBSF Junior World Championships in 2019 and 2020, finishing as the highest-ranked slider from North America in both events.

Senior
During the 2019–20 season, Enzie competed on the intercontinental circuit and had his highest finish of 15th. Enzie would make his World Cup debut at the end of December 2021, with his best placing a 19th place in St. Moritz in January 2022.

In January 2022, Enzie was named to Canada's 2022 Olympic team.

References

2001 births
Living people
Canadian male skeleton racers
Sportspeople from Calgary
Skeleton racers at the 2022 Winter Olympics
Olympic skeleton racers of Canada